Ifo is a Local Government Area in Ogun State, Nigeria. The postal code of the area is 112.

Transportation
Ifo is connected to nearby Lagos by a railway that was completed in 1899, with a length of 77 kilometers (48 mi). Roads connect it to Lagos as well as Abeokuta, Ilaro, Shagamu, Itori, and Ketou.

Languages
The main dialects in Ifo are the Awori and Egba dialects of the Yoruba language and English language

Nearby localities
Nearby major towns include Soyinka Alaja, iyana Cele,Igbusi, Ilepa, Onihale, Pakoto, Kajola, Lisa, Oyero, Arepo, Seriki, Coker, Ibogun, Matogun, Lambe, Alagbole, Ajuwon and Akute, Ojodu, Isheri all of which constitute their own communities with their own traditional rulers (Obas and Baale's). Together these areas make up Ifo Division. Ifo Division has a large industrial area containing several factories. The town of Ifo itself is home to branches of several established Nigerian banks.
Ifo is the fastest growing part-market of the Ogun metropolis, owing in part to increasing influxes of people from Ifo's surrounding towns and villages who are attracted by the town's proximity to Lagos State.

Religion
Inhabitants of Ifo include adherents to several religions, including Christianity, Islam, and traditional worship.

Education
Within greater Ifo, there are more than 5 public primary schools and 10 secondary schools. There are also several private nurseries, primary and secondary schools, and 2 tertiary institutions.

Local schools include:

The prime scholar's school, Ifo
Bookers International School, Ifo
Rex-Age transnational School
Emili-Obadina Memorial school, Ajowa.
Community primary school, Agosi
The Nations Talents school, Ifo.
Astute college 
Rabbi Comprehensive College
Government Primary School 1,2,3
Abekoko Grammar School
Nawair u Deen Grammar School
Ifo High School
Adenrele High School
Don Phillips group of schools
Estad group of schools olose ifo
Leah's primary school
Temperance comprehensive college
Methodist high school
Government Technical College olose
Oke pata Senior govt College
 Martins Montessori College
Toaz Primary School
Step Up group of school 
Pakoto High School
Solu Senior Grammar School
Ireti Olu Model college, Ifo.
Access model college
Ifo City Polytechnic Ifo
Ar nur International College, Ifo
Adnaps group of schools
Double crown group of schools
New Life Secondary School Ifo
Ajuwon High School, Iju Ajuwon
Breakthrough Academy, Awo Akute
God's Grace School
Ifo college of technology, Tecno-Bus/stop

Olabisi Onabanjo University is a public university located in the Ibogun area of the town.

References

Local Government Areas in Ogun State